"Guru Maneyo Granth" (Gurmukhi: ਗੁਰੂ ਮਾਨਿਓ ਗ੍ਰੰਥ or ਗੁਰੂ ਮਾਨਯੋ ਗ੍ਰੰਥ gurū māni'ō gratha; English: "Granth be Thy Guru") refers to the historic statement of the 10th Sikh Guru, Sri Guru Gobind Singh (1666–1708) shortly before his demise on affirming the sacred scripture Adi Granth as his successor, thereby terminating the line of human Gurus. Installed as the Guru Granth Sahib, it is now the central holy scripture of Sikhism, and the eternal living Guru of all Sikhs. It is central to Sikh worship as it is said to imbibe the one light of the creator manifested in the Ten Sikh Gurus—one spirit in ten forms. 

The event on 20 October 1708 at Nanded (in present-day Maharashtra), when Guru Gobind Singh installed Adi Granth as the Guru of Sikhism, was recorded in a Bhatt Vahi (a bard's scroll) by an eyewitness, Narbud Singh, and is now celebrated as Gurgaddi (Guru Gaddi Divas). Guru Gobind Singh's statement is part of the central chant "Sabh Sikhan ko Hukam Hai, Guru Maneyo Granth." October 2008 marked the tercentenary year of Guruship of Guru Granth Sahib and was marked by major celebrations by Sikhs worldwide. Nanded especially saw yearlong celebrations the same year at Takht Sri Hazur Sahib.

Adi Granth to Guru Granth Sahib

The composition of the sacred Granth contains renderings of the hymns (bani) of six Sikh Gurus (from Guru Nanak to Guru Arjun as well as the ninth Guru, Guru Tegh Bahadur) of the Sikh faith along with fifteen Bhagats, eleven Bhatts, and three Gursikhs (Bhai Sundar Ji, Bhai Satta Ji, Bhai Balwand Ji). It was composed in this form in the year 1604 with the later addition of Guru Tegh Bahadur's bani (sacred compositions). Its blessings are sought by the true seeker with a devout heart. The Sikh religion sincerely believes that in each of the succeeding Gurus the spirit, the light of God which manifested in Guru Nanak, was operating and passed on to the next Sikh Guru. Guru Ram Das says in the Siri Guru Granth Sahib, "Waho Waho Satgur Nirankar Hai, Jis Ant Na Paravar," meaning, "The Lord descends in this world in the form of The Satguru, but only some rare soul/devotee is able to recognise him." (SGGS, Ang 1421)

The sacred Granth is installed in all Sikh holy places of worship and treated as the presiding presence of the Guru, an embodiment of Divine Truth.  The devotees of the sangat or congregation gather in solemn assembly to pray and seek the blessings of the Supreme. This comes through in the mystical wisdom contained within the words of Gurbani and it stands for realization of the Truth. The Gurus' word, called shabad is taken as the mystic experience of the Guru.

In the words of Bhai Gurdas, a great scholar of the Guru's time, "In the word is the Guru, and the Guru is in the word (shabad).  In other words, the human body was not the Guru, but the light of the word (shabad) within the heart was their real personality." When the human mind dives deeper and deeper into the Guru's word, all mental impurities depart and the wisdom of the Guru permeates the human soul. As a result, the devotee attains the divine light and wisdom which leads him to contemplate and meditate on God's name (Naam). In light of the above realities, the Sikh religion makes the holy Granth the living master of the Sikh Panth.

Before Guru Gobind Singh, the tenth Guru, left his human body, he conferred the Guruship to the [Adi Granth]. He then delivered a self-composed hymn:

 Agya bhai Akal ki tabhi chalayo Panth. Sabh Sikhan ko hukam hai Guru manyo Granth. Guru Granth Ji manyo pargat Guran ki deh.
 Jo Prabhu ko milo chahe khoj shabad mein le. Raj karega Khalsa aqi rahei na koe, Khwar hoe sabh milange bache sharan jo hoe."

Translation:

"Under orders of the Immortal Being, the Panth was created. All  Sikhs are enjoined to accept the Granth as their Guru.
 Consider the Guru Granth as an embodiment of the Gurus.Those who want to meet God, can find Him in its hymns. The pure Khalsa shall rule, and the impures will be left no more, Those separated will unite and all the devotees of the Guru shall be saved."

He also offered his obeisance to the sacred Granth, thus conveying his Light to it. This historic development which took place in October 1708 ensured that the order of the Khalsa brotherhood always remained an abiding force for Sikh Panth unity.

Mul Mantar 

The Guru Granth Sahib begins with the Mul Mantar, an iconic verse created by Nanak:

ISO 15919 transliteration: Ika ōaṅkāra sati nāmu karatā purakhu nirabha'u niravairu akāla mūrati ajūnī saibhaṅ gura prasādi jap ade sache jugade sache, haibhi sach, Nanake hosee bhee sache
Simplified transliteration: Ik ōaṅkār sat nām kartā purkh nirbha'u nirvair akāl mūrat ajūnī saibhaṅ gur prasād jap, aad sach, jugad sach, hai bhee sach, Nanak hosi bhee sach.

Historical events have clearly brought out that when Guru Nanak Dev appeared before the Supreme Lord, he himself presented to him a cup of God's name known as Amrita to propagate to his subjects. Guru Nanak Dev received the Mul Mantar in his divine consciousness and it defines the fundamental directive spiritual philosophy of Sikhism. It appears in the very beginning of Sri Guru Granth Sahib ahead of Japji.

It is composed of two elements: the figure ik (1) and the symbol onkar. The term ik onkar in full form is meant to describe the transcendent formless God as creator, sustainer, and dissoluter. The symbol onkar gives the mystical interpretation of the immanent spirit of God and his becoming aspect which created the universe. There is a belief that the universe was created through a primordial sound (kavao) known as first wisdom of God. It acts as an intermediary between the creator and his creation. God is spirit and pure light (Jyoti) that excites every human mind to realize the truth.

In Sikh mysticism, while meditating on Mul Mantar and its repetition believed to lead the soul to absorption in the absolute. The Mul Mantar and the Gurmantra Waheguru - the Name of god in Sikhism, repeated constantly induce a high spiritual state. The Gurmantra Waheguru - Naam unites the individual soul with the God. The Mul Mantar invokes all qualities of God. It is called the fate remover. Thus God's name is not a syllable word but a code to unfold the mystic properties of divine spirit which controls the cosmic and human being through invisible law of nature. Real name of god implies expression of his pervasive personality and concrete truth of His existence. Naam demands moulding of our personality which is meant opening of our inner self to establish personal touch with reality.  Therefore, one has to be ethically strong, thoughtful and rightly meditative to attain this higher truth which is immediate and principle of man. Birth as a human being is to be taken as an opportunity to achieve liberation.  It is because the achievement of emancipation is possible to man alone and that too on this earth. The history of a particular individual, the number of times he experiences rebirth depends entirely upon the quality of his will, upon the moral effort he puts forth.

To sum up, Sri Guru Granth Sahib of Sikh faith is a unique spiritual measure which gives an analytical view of the divine laws which are hidden from human gaze. Each chosen word of the text encodes the secret power of the eternity and blueprints of his working in the fleeting world of forms.

References

Further reading
 Guru Manyo Granth, by Harnam Dass Sahrai. Lokgeet Prakashan, 1989.

1708 in India
1700s neologisms
History of Sikhism
Sikh scripture
Sikh terminology
Punjabi words and phrases
Quotations from religion